Hilje Murel (born 17 December 1975) is an Estonian stage, film, and television actress.

Early life and education
Hilje Murel was born in the town of Võru in Võru County. She is a 1998 graduate of the EMA Higher Drama School (now, the Estonian Academy of Music and Theatre) in Tallinn. Among her graduating classmates were: Tiit Sukk, Veikko Täär, Harriet Toompere, Andero Ermel, Liina Vahtrik, and Jan Uuspõld.

Career

Stage
In 1998, shortly after graduation from the EMA Higher Drama School, Murel began an engagement as an actress at the Ugala theatre in Viljandi where she made her stage debut in the role of Ida in Astrid Saalbach's 1986 play The Dance Lesson. Murel would spend ten years as an actress with the Ugala, leaving the theatre in 2008. Memorable performances during her years onstage with the Ugala theatre include roles in works by such varied contemporary and classic international authors and playwrights as: Shakespeare, Molière, Leo Tolstoy, David Harrower, Thorbjørn Egner, Friedrich Schiller, Mark Twain, Fyodor Dostoyevsky, Conor McPherson, Ben Travers, Mark Ravenhill, Isaac Bashevis Singer, Eve Ensler, Giovanni Boccaccio, Erich Maria Remarque, Nikolai Gogol, Jean Anouilh, Anton Chekhov, Otfried Preußler, Alistair Beaton, and Donald Margulies, among others. Roles in works by Estonian authors and playwrights include works by: Oskar Luts, Eduard Vilde, A. H. Tammsaare, Kauksi Ülle, Olev Remsu, Hella Wuolijoki, Urmas Lennuk, August Gailit, August Kitzberg, and Loone Ots, among several others.

In 2008, Murel joined the Estonian Drama Theatre in Tallinn, where she is still currently engaged. The same year, she made her stage debut as Miss Framer in a production of Peter Shaffer's 1987 satirical play Lettice and Lovage. Other roles in productions of works by authors and playwrights include: Tennessee Williams, Juan Rulfo, Arthur Miller, Halldór Laxness, Tom Stoppard, Andrus Kivirähk, Tracy Letts, Jane Bowles, and David Hare. More recent roles have included Dorine in Molière's Tartuffe, Jenny in Simon Gray's Final, and Françoise Hirt in Yasmina Reza's Bella Figura.

Film
Hilje Murel made her film debut in starring role as Li in the Rainer Sarnet-directed 1998 dramatic short film Libarebased ja kooljad in 1998, which was adapted from the collection of short stories by Qing dynasty Chinese writer Pu Songling and produced by Eesti Televisioon (ETV) and Eesti Telefilm.

In 2003, she appeared in the role of Linda's daughter in the Rando Pettai-directed, Peep Pedmanson penned comedy Vanad ja kobedad saavad jalad alla (English release title: Made in Estonia). The film was based on the popular Estonian television comedy series Vanad ja kobedad. In 2004, she had a starring role in the Andres Maimik-directed dramatic short film Kurat tuleb sauna; based on the leitmotif Saunakuuldemängu of Estonian writer Mati Unt. This was followed by a small role as Nasta in the 2008 Ain Mäeots-directed Exitfilm biographical feature film Taarka, based on the play of the same name by Kauksi Ülle about the difficult life of Seto folk singer Hilana Taarka. Taarka has the distinction of being the first feature-length film in the Seto dialect, and won the 2008 Estonian Cultural Endowment Debut Award.

In 2013, she played the role of Silvi Säinas in the Toomas Hussar-directed comedy-adventure film Seenelkäik; the film was selected as the Estonian entry for the Best Foreign Language Oscar at the 85th Academy Awards, but it did not make the final shortlist. In 2013, Murel played the role of Berit Piir in the family-fantasy drama Väikelinna detektiivid ja valge daami saladus, directed by René Vilbre and penned by Mikhel Ulman. In 2016, Murel had a small role in the Valentin Kuik and Manfred Vainokivi-directed melodrama Perekonnavaled. In 2018, she appeared in a supporting role in the Liina Triškina-Vanhatalo-directed drama Võta või jäta  and in 2020, appeared in the Peeter Simm directed coming-of-age period drama Vee peal.

In 2020, she voiced the character Mother Rat in the Meelis Arulepp and Karsten Kiilerich directed animated film Sipsik, based on the popular 1962 children's book of the same title by Eno Raud.

Television
Hilje Murel's first substantial television role was as Ludmila in the four episodes of the Swedish television drama miniseries Soldater i månsken in 2000. In 2005, she appeared as Anu in the Ilmar Raag directed feature-length television drama film August 1991; a dramatization of the failed Soviet attempt to suppress the independence movement in Estonia during the 1991 Soviet coup d'état attempt. The following year, she had a recurring role as Lea on the popular Kanal 2 crime-drama series Kelgukoerad. In 2007, she appeared as Külli in the Andri Luup directed joint Estonian-Finnish television comedy film Kinnunen about a Finnish misfit (played by Sesa Lehto) searching for a wife in Estonia.

In 2013, Murel appeared in several episodes of the comedic ETV political satire series Riigimehed. Throughout the 2000s, Murel has also made appearances on several other television series, including: the ETV crime drama seris Ohtlik lend, the TV3 comedy-crimes series Kättemaksukontor, and the Kanal 2 crime series Viimane võmm, among others. In 2014, she joined the cast of the Kanal 2 comedy series Parim enne as the character Kelluke.

She appeared in the Võru dub of "Peppa Pig", as well as several Estonian live action dramas and films, and it is probable that she dubbed the Võru dub of Series 23 of Thomas & Friends.

Personal life
Hilje Murel currently resides in Tallinn with her two children, a daughter and a son.

References

External links

1975 births
Living people
Estonian stage actresses
Estonian film actresses
Estonian television actresses
Estonian Academy of Music and Theatre alumni
People from Võru
20th-century Estonian actresses
21st-century Estonian actresses